Amílcar Méndez Urízar is a Guatemalan human rights activist and former Congressman (1996–2000). In July 1988 he founded the Council for Ethnic Communities "We Are All Equal" (CERJ). In 1990 he was the recipient of the Robert F. Kennedy Human Rights Award and the Carter-Menil Human Rights Prize.

In October 2003, the Inter-American Commission on Human Rights requested that Guatemala adopt precautionary measures to protect the life and person of Méndez in the wake of death threats made against him and the murder of another CERJ activist.
On 17 August 2007, his son José Emanuel was murdered in Guatemala City.

References

External links
Justice for Pepe, Justice for Guatemala Campaign

Living people
Guatemalan human rights activists
Nonviolence advocates
Guatemalan activists
Members of the Congress of Guatemala
Year of birth missing (living people)
Robert F. Kennedy Human Rights Award laureates